Legion of the Doomed is a 1958 American adventure film directed by Thor L. Brooks and written by Tom Hubbard and Fred Eggers. The film stars Bill Williams, Dawn Richard, Anthony Caruso, Kurt Kreuger, Tom Hubbard and Hal Gerard. The film was released on September 21, 1958, by Allied Artists Pictures.

Plot

Cast          
Bill Williams as Lt. Smith
Dawn Richard as Dalbert Marcheck
Anthony Caruso as Sgt. Calvelli
Kurt Kreuger as Capt. Marcheck
Tom Hubbard as Tom Brodie
Hal Gerard as Garabi
John Damler as Darjon
Rush Williams as Canuck
George Baxter as Col. Lesperance
Saul Gorss as Sgt. Tordeau
Joe Abdullah as Karaba

References

External links
 

1958 films
American adventure films
1958 adventure films
Allied Artists films
Films set in deserts
Films about the French Foreign Legion
1950s English-language films
1950s American films